Lyapichev is a rural locality (a khutor) and the administrative center of Lyapichevskoye Rural Settlement, Kalachyovsky District, Volgograd Oblast, Russia. The population was 1,266 as of 2010. There are 22 streets.

Geography 
Lyapichev is located 60 km south of Kalach-na-Donu (the district's administrative centre) by road. Donskoy is the nearest rural locality.

References 

Rural localities in Kalachyovsky District